Kwisno  is a village in Gmina Miastko, Bytów County, Pomeranian Voivodeship, in northern Poland.

From 1975 to 1998 the village was in Słupsk Voivodeship. 

It has a population of 48.

References

Map of the Gmina Miastko

Kwisno